Jimmy Whitfield (18 May 1919 – 1984) was an English professional footballer who scored 38 goals from 161 appearances in the Football League playing as an inside forward for Grimsby Town, Scunthorpe United (in two separate spells) and Southport.

Career
Whitfield was born in Hull. He began his career in the Football League with Grimsby Town, before joining Scunthorpe United, then playing in the Midland League, for a £900 fee in February 1949. He scored 29 goals in the club's last season in non-League football and played one season in the League before moving on to Southport in September 1951. After only five months, he returned to Scunthorpe, where he played regularly for two seasons, but at the end of the 1954–55 season he returned to non-League football with Boston United, Brigg Town and Alford United. He died in 1984.

Notes

References

1919 births
1984 deaths
Footballers from Kingston upon Hull
English footballers
Association football forwards
Grimsby Town F.C. players
Scunthorpe United F.C. players
Southport F.C. players
Boston United F.C. players
English Football League players